The Buckner Building is an abandoned former U.S. military building in Whittier, Alaska, on the Western edge of the Prince William Sound.

History 
During the early stages of World War II, General Simon Buckner commanded the defense of Alaska and was concerned they would be attacked by air. To protect the troops, General Buckner recommended a facility that was independent from local power plants, bomb-proof, and that had sufficient storage spaces. Whittier, Alaska was the perfect place to have this military base.

First, the bay area around Whittier, Alaska has deep-water ports that stay ice-free year round. With Whittier being one of two all-weather railroad ports that supplied Anchorage with military necessities, it was important that it would stay functioning and safeguarded. Second, the almost constant cloud coverage would protect the facility from air strikes.

Annex 
The Cold War triggered the United States Army Corps of Engineers to quickly build housing and recreational spaces for 1,000 soldiers moving to Whittier. The Composite Bachelor Housing Service and Recreation Center, also known as the Buckner Building, was completed in 1953. This combined building had a mess hall, sleeping quarters, movie theatre, bowling alley, small jail, and tunnels connecting the town of Whittier, Alaska.

The building used to be one of the largest in Alaska, often being referred to as "the city under one roof". The building is six stories tall, about 500 feet long by 50–150 feet wide and is approximately 275,000 square feet. The building was cast in place by reinforced concrete on slate/greywacke bedrock, 8,1.

Earthquake 
In 1964, Whittier was hit by an earthquake that lasted about four and a half minutes. A total of 13 people died in Whittier and damages to federal and privately owned land was estimated to cost over $5 million. The Buckner Building was slightly damaged, though it was minimized due to the foundation being on bedrock, as opposed to the majority of the town which rests on unconsolidated sediment and therefore received more damage. The Buckner Building also runs northeast–southwest, oblique to the seismic motion, decreasing the effect of the earthquake on the building. There was no structural damage to the building, and subsequent inspections found the building to be in good condition.

Decline 

The building continued to operate until 1966, at which point the military pulled out and the Port of Whittier was transferred to the General Services Administration. After the military left, the ownership of the Buckner Building went through a handful of people. At one point, it was owned by one Pete Zamarillo who wanted to turn it into the state prison. In 1972, it was purchased by the citizens of the new City of Whittier and soon fell into disrepair. With the windows and doors missing, the elements began to take it over, water infiltrated, leaving the building in a constant state of freezing and thawing.

The building went into foreclosure  in 2016. The city assumed ownership and a fence was built to keep trespassers out. A structural assessment of the building in 2016 concluded that it was unlikely that any significant portion of the building could be rehabilitated for occupancy.

See also
 Begich Towers a newer "city under one roof" also located in Whittier

References

1953 establishments in Alaska
Apartment buildings in Alaska
Buildings and structures in Chugach Census Area, Alaska
Government buildings completed in 1953
Office buildings in Alaska
Residential buildings completed in 1953
Unused buildings in Alaska